Entreprise may refer to:

 L'Entreprise was French frigate captured in May 1705, and recommissioned as 

The French Navy had, between 1671 and 1846, at least 23 sailing vessels christened with the name , French for "Enterprising"

See also
Entreprenant (disambiguation)
Enterprise (disambiguation)

French Navy ship names